The Sacred Heart Church is a Catholic church, of neogothic style located in the historic center of the city of Samara, Russia.

In 1902 it was decided to expand and build a church of red brick neo-Gothic style. At a cost of 80 thousand rubles, the project was entrusted to the Polish architect Bogdanovich (or Bohdanowicz), who built the Cathedral of the Immaculate Conception in Moscow. Under the patronage of the Sacred Heart of Jesus, it was consecrated in February 1906. Its two towers of 47 m in height made it for a long time the tallest building in the city.

The parish was disbanded by the Soviet authorities in the 1920s. Later, they closed the church, and it was vandalised. In 1941, a regional museum was installed there.

In 1991, the Catholic community regained the church for worship.

See also
Roman Catholicism in Russia
Sacred Heart Church

References

Buildings and structures in Samara, Russia
Roman Catholic churches completed in 1906
1906 establishments in the Russian Empire
20th-century Roman Catholic church buildings in Russia
Cultural heritage monuments of federal significance in Samara Oblast
Gothic Revival church buildings in Russia